Dolné Otrokovce is a village and municipality in Hlohovec District in the Trnava Region of western Slovakia.

History
In historical records the village was first mentioned in 1400.

Geography
The municipality lies at an altitude of 180 metres and covers an area of 9.305 km². It has a population of about 342 people.

Genealogical resources

The records for genealogical research are available at the state archive "Statny Archiv in Bratislava,Nitra, Slovakia"

 Roman Catholic church records (births/marriages/deaths): 1719-1899 (parish B)

See also
 List of municipalities and towns in Slovakia

References

External links
https://web.archive.org/web/20080111223415/http://www.statistics.sk/mosmis/eng/run.html
Surnames of living people in Dolne Otrokovce

Villages and municipalities in Hlohovec District